Red Horse is a collaboration by independent folk singer-songwriters Eliza Gilkyson, John Gorka, and Lucy Kaplansky.  It is both the name of the studio album released by the trio on Red House Records in July 2010, and the name under which they have toured and performed in concert together as a supergroup.

Track listing

Chart performance
Sales charts:

Radio airplay charts:

Tour dates

References

External links 
 Red Horse page at RedHouseRecords.com
 Red Horse page at MySpace.com
 Red Horse page at facebook.com
 Red Horse: Three Singer-Songwriters United In Harmony (Audio & interview with John Gorka and Lucy Kaplansky), Weekend Edition Sunday, NPR, August 1, 2010
Get to know Red Horse! (text interview), Red House Records Blog Cabin, July 12, 2010

Collaborative albums
John Gorka albums
Lucy Kaplansky albums
2010 albums
Red House Records albums